Georges Lochak is a French physicist known for his work on magnetic monopoles.

Biography
Lochak was born in 1930 to a Russian family exiled in France due to the Russian revolution and civil war. Lochak studied physics and mathematics at the Sorbonne and the Institut Henri Poincaré from 1950 to 1954.

He worked at the Institute Henri Poincaré, the Joint Institute for Nuclear Research (Dubna, Russia) and the Joliot-Curie-Laboratory for Nuclear Physics (University of Paris-Sud). By the time of his retirement in 1996 he was the former director of research at CNRS.

Lochak worked closely with Nobel laureate Louis de Broglie throughout the later part of de Brogile's life and he is currently president of the Fondation Louis-de-Broglie.

Bibliography

References

Notes

Citations

External links

 Georges Lochak biography
 Georges Lochak website
 Fondation Louis-de-Broglie website

Living people
Theoretical physicists
20th-century French physicists
Quantum physicists
Scientists from Paris
1930 births